Arman (November 17, 1928 – October 22, 2005) was a French-born American artist. Born Armand Fernandez in Nice, France, Arman was a painter who moved from using objects for the ink or paint traces they leave (cachets, allures d'objet) to using them as the artworks themselves. He is best known for his Accumulations and destruction/recomposition of objects.

Early life and education
Arman's father, Antonio Fernandez, an antiques dealer from Nice, was also an amateur artist, photographer, and cellist. From his father, Arman learned oil painting and photography. After receiving his bachelor's degree in philosophy and mathematics in 1946, Arman began studying at the École Nationale des Arts Décoratifs in Nice. He also studied judo at a police school in Nice, where he met Yves Klein and Claude Pascal. The trio bonded closely on a subsequent hitch-hiking tour around Europe.

Completing his studies in 1949, Arman enrolled as a student at the École du Louvre in Paris, where he concentrated on the study of archaeology and Asian art. In 1951, he became a teacher at the Bushido Kai Judo Club in Madrid, Spain. During this time he also served in the French military, completing his tour of duty as a medical orderly during the Indo-China War.

Early career

Early on, it was apparent that Arman's concept of the accumulation of vast quantities of similar objects was to remain a significant component of his art. He had originally focused more attention on his abstract paintings, considering them to be of more consequence than his early accumulations of rubber stamps. Only when he witnessed viewer reaction to his first Accumulation in 1959 did he fully recognize the power of such art. In 1962, he began welding together Accumulations of similar kinds of metal objects, such as axes.

Inspiration and name change
Inspired by an exhibition for the German Dadaist Kurt Schwitters in 1954, Arman began working on Cachets, his first major artistic undertaking. At his third solo exhibition held in Paris's Galerie Iris Clert in 1958, Arman showed some of his first 2D accumulations he called Cachets. These rubber stamp marks on paper and fabric proved a success and provided an important change of course for the young artist's career.

At the time, he was signing only with his first name as an homage to Van Gogh, who also signed his works with his first name, "Vincent". In 1957, Arman chose to change his name from "Armand" to "Arman". On January 31, 1973, upon becoming a citizen of the United States, he took the American civil name, "Armand Pierre Arman". Nevertheless, he continued to use "Arman" as his public persona.

Evolution of work
From 1959 to 1962, Arman developed his most recognizable style, beginning with his two most renowned concepts: Accumulations and Poubelles (French for "trash bins"). Accumulations were collections of commonplace and similar objects which he arranged within transparent polyester castings, or within Plexiglas cases. His first welded Accumulations were created in 1962.

The Poubelles were collections of strewn refuse. In 1960, he filled the Iris Clert Gallery in Paris with trash, creating Le Plein (The Full) as a counterpoint to an exhibition called Le Vide (The Void) at the same gallery two years earlier by his friend Yves Klein.
   
In October 1960, Arman, Yves Klein, François Dufrêne, Raymond Hains, Martial Raysse, Daniel Spoerri, Jean Tinguely, Jacques Villeglé, and art critic and philosopher Pierre Restany founded the Nouveau Réalisme group. Joined later by Cesar, Mimmo Rotella, Niki de Saint Phalle, and Christo, the group of young artists defined themselves as bearing in common their "new perspective approaches of reality". They were reassessing the concept of art and the artist for a 20th-century consumer society by reasserting humanistic ideals in the face of industrial expansion. Arman also became affiliated with the ZERO art movement based in Germany.
 
In 1961, Arman made his debut in the United States, the country which was to become his second home. During this period, he explored creation via destruction. The Coupes (Cuts) and the Colères (Angers) featured sliced, burned, or smashed objects arranged on canvas, often using objects with a strong "identity" such as musical instruments (mainly violins and saxophones) or bronze statues.

Arman and Warhol

Arman can be seen in Andy Warhol's film Dinner at Daley's, a documentation of a dinner performance by the Fluxus artist Daniel Spoerri that Warhol filmed on March 5, 1964. Throughout the portrait-screen-test film, Arman sits in profile, looking down, appearing to be entranced in his reading, seemingly unaware of Warhol's camera, only making small gestures, rubbing his eyes, and licking the corner of his mouth. He remained silent, eyes gazing over the pages of what seemed to be a newspaper, in this four-minute, 16mm black-and-white reel. Warhol owned two of Arman's Poubelles and another accumulation called Amphetamines, which were sold at Sotheby's auction of the Andy Warhol Collection in May 1988.

Move to New York City
Fascinated with the scene in New York City, Arman took up part-time residency there from his home in Nice in 1961, after his first exhibition at the Cordier Warren Gallery. In the city, he met Marcel Duchamp at a dinner given by the artist and collector William Copley. First living at the Chelsea Hotel and later in Church street, while keeping a studio in Bowery, then in TriBeCa, Arman began work on large public sculptures. 

There were varied expressions of the Accumulations, including tools, watches, clocks, furniture, automobile parts, jewelry, and musical instruments in various stages of dismemberment. Musical instruments, specifically the strings and bronze, through his collaboration with a foundry in Normandy, France, became a major theme in Arman's work.   
  
Of Arman's Accumulations, one of the largest is Long Term Parking, which is on permanent display at the Château de Montcel in Jouy-en-Josas, France. Just as ambitious was his 1995 work Hope for Peace, which was specially commissioned by the Lebanese government to commemorate 50 years of their military's service. Standing in once war-torn Beirut, the  monument consists of 83 tanks and military vehicles.

Personal life
In 1953, Arman married electronic music composer Eliane Radigue and had two daughters, Marion (1951) and Anne (1953) and one son, Yves Arman (1954–1989). In 1971, he married Corice Canton, with whom he had one daughter, Yasmine (1982) and one son, Philippe (1987). In 1989, he had his sixth and last child, Yves Cesar Arman, son of Carrole Cesar.

After Arman's death in New York in 2005, some of his ashes were buried at the Père Lachaise Cemetery in Paris in 2008.

Selected exhibitions and awards

1960s
1964 
Arman, Stedelijk Museum, Amsterdam, Holland
Arman, Walker Art Center, Minneapolis, Minnesota

1965 
Arman, Museum Hans Lange, Krefeld, Germany

1966
Arman, Palais de Beaux-Arts, Brussels, Belgium 
Arman, Musée de la Ville, Saint-Paul-de-Vence, France

1967 
Arman, Palazzo Grassi, Venice, Italy

1969
Arman: Accummulations Renault (traveling exhibition):
Stedelijk Museum, Amsterdam, Holland
Musée des Arts Decoratifs, Paris, France
Louisiana Museum of Modern Art
Humlebaek, Denmark
Kunsthalle, Berlin, Germany
Städtische Kunsthalle, Düsseldorf, Germany
Moderna Museet, Stockholm, Sweden
Städtische Kunstammlungen, Ludwigshafen, Germany
Kunsthaus, Zürich, Switzerland
Amos Anderson Taidemuseo, Helsinki, Helsingfors, Finland

1970s
1970 
Arman, Modern Art Museum, Stockholm, Sweden
 
1974 
Arman, Salles romanes du Cloître Saint-Trophime, Musée Réattu, Arles, France
Arman: Selected Works 1958-1974, La Jolla Museum of Contemporary Art, California; *Fort Worth Art Museum, Texas
 
1975 
Arman: Objets Armés 1971-1974, Paris, Musée d'Art Moderne de la Ville de Paris, France
 
1976 
Arman, Artcurial auction house, Paris, France
 
1977 
Arman: Paintings and Sculptures, Ulrich Museum of Art, Wichita State University, Kansas
 
1978 
Arman, Veranneman Foundation, Kruishoutem, Belgium
 
1979 
Arman: Rétrospective, Centre d'Art et de Culture, Flaine, France

1980s
1980  
Arman, Veranneman Foundation, Kruishoutem, Belgium
 
1981 
Arman, Hessisches Landesmuseum, Darmstadt, Germany
 
1982 
Arman: Parade der Objekte: Retrospektive 1955-1982 (traveling exhibition):
Kunstmuseum, Sammlung Sprengel, Hanover, Germany
Hessisches Landesmuseum, Darmstadt, Germany
Tel Aviv Museum, Israel
Kunsthalle, Tübingen, Germany
Musée Picasso, Château Grimaldi, Antibes, France
Musée d'Art Contemporain Dunkerque, France
 
1984 
Arman o L’Oggetto come Alfabeto: Retrospettiva 1955-1984, Museo Civico delle Belle Arti, Lugano, Switzerland
Arman, Museo d'Arte Moderna, Parma, Italy
 
1985 
Arman, Seibu Museum of Art, Tokyo, Japan; Walker Hill Art Center, Seoul, Korea
Arman Aujourd’hui, Musée de Toulon, France
 
1986 
Arman: Retrospective, Wichita State University, Ulrich Museum of Art, Kansas
Arman, Veranneman Foundation, Kruishoutem, Belgium

1990s
1991 
Arman in Italy, Fondazione Mudima, Milan, Italy
Arman Sculpture, Contemporary Sculpture Center, Tokyo, Japan
Arman: A Retrospective 1955 - 1991, The Brooklyn Museum, Brooklyn, New York; The Detroit Institute of Art, Detroit, Michigan
 
1992 
Il Giro di Arman, Associazione Culturale Italo-Francese, Bologna, Italy
 
1994 
Le Ceramica di Arman, Museo Internazionale delle Ceramiche in Faenza, Faenze, Italy
 
1995 
Arman, Musée Royal de Mariemont, Mariemont-Chapelle, Belgium
 
1996 
Arman: The Exhibition of International Sculpture Master, Modern Art Gallery, Taichung, Taïwan
 
1998 
Arman, Musée du Jeu de Paume, Paris, France
 
1999 
Arman, Tel Aviv Museum of Art, Israel
Arman, Museu de Arte Moderna do Rio de Janeiro, Brazil; Museu de Arte de São Paulo Assis Chateaubriand, São Paulo, Brazil

21st Century
2000 
Arman—20 stations de l'objet, Couvent des Cordeliers, Paris, France
Arman, Fundaciò "la Caixa," Barcelona, Spain
Arman, la traversée des objets, Palazzo delle Zitelle, Venice, Italy
Arman, Museo de Monterrey, Mexico
Arman, National Museum of History, Taipei, Taiwan
 
2000-01 
Arman: Werke auf Papier, Ludwig Museum, Coblenz, Germany
 
2001-02 
Arman: Through and Across Objects, Boca Raton Museum of Art, Florida
 
2002 
Arman: Works on Paper, Villa Haiss Museum, Zell, Germany

2003 
Awarded 2003 Sport Artist of the Year, The American Sport Art Museum and Archives, United States Sports Academy, Daphne, Alabama
Arman: Arman, Museum of Contemporary Art of Teheran, Teheran, Iran
Arman, Marlborough New York City

2004 
Omaggio ad Arman Arte Silva, Sergno
Arman—Peinture, Marlborough Monaco, Monaco

2005 
Hommage a Arman, Galerie Anne Lettree, Paris

2006 
Arman—Subida al Cielo, Musée d' Art Moderne et d'Art Contemporain Nice, France
Arman—A Tribute to Arman, Marlborough Gallery, New York
Arman—No Comment, Galerie Georges-Phillippe & Nathalie Vallois, Paris

2008 
Arman, Palazzo Bricherasio, Turin

2010-2011 
Arman, a retrospective, Centre Georges Pompidou, Oct. 2010, Paris
Arman, retrospective, Museum Tinguely, Feb. 2011, Basel, Switzerland
Arman-in les Baux de Provence, July-Oct. 2011, Les Baux-de-Provence

2013
 Cycles, Paul Kasmin Gallery, New York

Public collections in the United States (selected)
Fine Arts Museums of San Francisco, California
Hirshhorn Museum and Sculpture Garden, Washington, DC
Ulrich Museum of Art, Wichita, Kansas
Harvard Art Museum, Cambridge, Massachusetts
The Detroit Institute of Arts, Detroit, Michigan
Walker Art Center, Minneapolis, Minnesota
Laumeier Sculpture Park, St. Louis, Missouri
Mildred Lane Kemper Art Museum, St. Louis, Missouri
Saint Louis Art Museum, St. Louis, Missouri
Everson Museum of Art, Syracuse, New York
The Museum of Modern Art, New York
Allen Art Museum, Oberlin College, Ohio
Bellevue Art Museum, Bellevue, Washington
Boca Raton Museum of Art, Boca Raton, Florida

Selected press
Galenson, David, "Arman and the Art of the Object," Huffington Post, 01/25/11.
Johnson, Ken, "Art in Review: Arman-- 'A Survey: 1954-2002'," The New York Times, 01/24/13.

Bibliography

Chalumeau, Jean-Luc and Pierre Restany (preface), Arman: Shooting Colors, Paris, France: Éditions de la Différence, Autre Musée/Grandes Monographies, 1989 
Kuspit, Donald. Monochrome Accumulations 1986—1989. Stockholm: A. H. Graphik, 1990 
Otmezguine, Jane and Marc Moreau, in collaboration with Corice Arman. Estampes. Paris: Éditions Marval, 1990
Durand-Ruel, Denyse. Arman - Vol. II: 1960 à 1962. Paris: Éditions de la Différence, 1991
Durand-Ruel, Denyse. Arman - Vol. III: 1963 à 1965. Paris: Éditions de la Différence, 1994
Bouhours, Jean-Michel (director), Arman exhibition catalogue, Paris: Centre Georges Pompidou, 2010

References

External links

Arman original website
Arman new site

Arman in Artcyclopedia
Foundation A.R.M.A.N. website
Oral history interview with Arman, 1968 Apr. 22 from the Smithsonian Archives of American Art
Arman in Les Baux de Provence (English)
virtual museum
 

1928 births
2005 deaths
People from Nice
20th-century American painters
American male painters
21st-century American painters
20th-century American sculptors
American male sculptors
20th-century French painters
20th-century French male artists
20th-century American male artists
French male painters
21st-century French painters
21st-century French male artists
21st-century American male artists
20th-century French sculptors
French male sculptors
Burials at Père Lachaise Cemetery
Deaths from cancer in New York (state)
École du Louvre alumni
French contemporary artists
Nouveau réalisme artists
20th-century American printmakers
20th-century French printmakers